Rawert is a surname. Notable people with the surname include:

 Jørgen Henrich Rawert (1751–1823), Danish architect
 Mechthild Rawert (born 1957), German politician
 Ole Jørgen Rawert (1786–1851), Danish civil servant and industrial historian